KSMT (102.1 FM, The Mountain) is a radio station broadcasting an adult album alternative music format. Licensed to Breckenridge, Colorado, United States, the station is currently owned by Patricia MacDonald Garber and Peter Benedetti, through licensee AlwaysMountainTime, LLC.

References

External links
 
 

SMT